All Youth Channels, Inc. (AYC) is a cable TV and concert management company in the Philippines. The company is currently the co-owner of cable channel Nickelodeon. AYC was also the final co-owner of MTV Philippines, which was closed down in 2010, and formerly operates two FM radio stations in Metro Manila (U92 (now Radyo5 92.3 News FM) and Radio High 105.9 (now Neo Retro 105.9). The current CEO is Francis Lumen, former radio executive of Nation Broadcasting Corporation.

The company's headquarters are located at Silver City Mall, Frontera Verde Complex, Pasig.

All Youth Channels was owned by Creative Programs, Inc., a subsidiary of ABS-CBN Corporation.

History
After the dissolution of its joint venture with NBC, MTV Networks Asia signed a licensing agreement with All Youth Channels, Inc. (AYC), which is run by some of the members of Music Source, including Lumen, to control both MTV Philippines and its sister channel, Nickelodeon. AYC owned and operated 100% of then-new MTV Philippines.

MTV Philippines was an exclusive channel on cable and satellite television systems. However, Lumen decided not to renew the contract (except Nickelodeon Philippines, MTV Philippines's sister channel). There were also some posts claiming that instead of funding for MTV Philippines, they would rather fund TV5 in which they planned to be the next big thing on TV (which later found out to be purchased by PLDT's MediaQuest Holdings, resulting to its relaunch followed by the revival of NBC-owned UHF 41 as AksyonTV). 11 minutes before midnight of February 16, 2010, the final music video: Video Killed the Radio Star by The Buggles was played and afterwards, MTV Philippines officially signed off. After the closure, it had reverted to its original channel, MTV Southeast Asia. All Youth Channels previously owned two radio stations: U92 which was sold to TV5 and branded it as Radyo5 92.3 News FM (the first all-news radio station in the FM band); and Radio High 105.9 which was returned to its original owner Bright Star Broadcasting Network Corporation and branded it as Retro 105.9 DCG FM (which plays mostly modern classic and retro-styled oldies music).

Events
AYC is a producer of big-name concerts in the Philippines, even after the shut down of MTV Philippines.

International artists
Timbaland
Justin Timberlake
JoJo
Rain
U-Kiss

Local artists
Christian Bautista

Partnerships and Affiliates

ViacomCBS Networks International Asia Pacific
Nation Broadcasting Corporation
GMA Network
Smart Communications
ABS-CBN Corporation
Solar Entertainment Corporation
TV5 Network
Sony Pictures Television Networks Asia (AXN Philippines, Inc.)

References

External links
Official website
MTV Philippines official website
Radio High official website

Creative Programs
Assets owned by ABS-CBN Corporation
Television networks in the Philippines
Companies based in Pasig